Events from the year 1538 in art.

Events

Works

 Hans Baldung – Ambrosius Volmar Keller
 Jacopo Bassano – The Supper at Emmaus
 Hans Holbein the younger
 Christina of Denmark
 Prince Edward
 Michelangelo – Study for the Colonna Pieta
 Titian – Venus of Urbino

Births
 Antonio Abondio, Italian sculptor, best known as a medallist and as the pioneer of the coloured wax relief portrait miniature (died 1591)
 Durante Alberti, Italian painter, member of family of artists (died 1613)
 Miguel Barroso, Spanish painter (died 1590)
 Benedetto Caliari, Italian painter (died 1598)
 Pablo de Céspedes, Spanish painter, poet, and architect (died 1608)
 Francesco Curia, Italian Renaissance painter (died 1610)
 Hernando de Ávila, Spanish painter and sculptor (died 1595)

Deaths
 Hans Dürer, German Renaissance painter, illustrator, and engraver (born 1490)
 Albrecht Altdorfer, German painter, pioneer of landscape in art (born 1480)
 Giorgio Gandini del Grano, Italian painter  of the Parmesan school of Painting (b. unknown)
 Zhang Lu, Chinese landscape painter during the Ming Dynasty (born 1464)

 
Years of the 16th century in art